Nikolay Andryushchenko (born 24 February 1931) is a Soviet athlete. He competed in the men's long jump at the 1952 Summer Olympics.

References

External links

1931 births
Possibly living people
Athletes (track and field) at the 1952 Summer Olympics
Soviet male long jumpers
Olympic athletes of the Soviet Union
Place of birth missing (living people)